Bedanda is a Sector in the Tombali Region of Guinea-Bissau.

See also
Jagidiss Bedanda

Tombali Region
Sectors of Guinea-Bissau
Populated places in Guinea-Bissau